The 1987 IAAF World Cross Country Championships was held in Warszawa, Poland, at the Służewiec Racecourse on March 22, 1987.   A report on the event was given in the Glasgow Herald and in the Evening Times.

Complete results for men, junior men, women, medallists, 
 and the results of British athletes were published.

Medallists

Race results

Senior men's race (11.95 km)

Note: Athletes in parentheses did not score for the team result

Junior men's race (7.05 km)

Note: Athletes in parentheses did not score for the team result

Senior women's race (5.05 km)

Note: Athletes in parentheses did not score for the team result

Medal table (unofficial)

Note: Totals include both individual and team medals, with medals in the team competition counting as one medal.

Participation
An unofficial count yields the participation of 576 athletes from 47 countries.  This is in agreement with the official numbers as published.

 (14)
 (18)
 (20)
 (11)
 (5)
 (20)
 (3)
 (7)
 (2)
 (8)
 (6)
 (3)
 (3)
 (21)
 (20)
 (20)
 (9)
 (8)
 (6)
 (14)
 (21)
 (3)
 (21)
 (7)
 (19)
 (21)
 (1)
 (6)
 (7)
 (14)
 (20)
 (2)
 (10)
 (20)
 (15)
 (5)
 (21)
 (11)
 (21)
 (21)
 (10)
 (14)
 (6)
 (20)
 (19)
 (17)
 (6)

See also
 1987 IAAF World Cross Country Championships – Senior men's race
 1987 IAAF World Cross Country Championships – Junior men's race
 1987 IAAF World Cross Country Championships – Senior women's race
 1987 in athletics (track and field)

References

External links
The World Cross Country Championships 1973-2005
GBRathletics
Athletics Australia

 
World Athletics Cross Country Championships
Cross Country
C
Sports competitions in Warsaw
International athletics competitions hosted by Poland
Cross country running in Poland
1980s in Warsaw
Iaaf World Cross Country Championships